Thomas Fabbiano and Andrei Karatchenia were the defending champions, but did not compete in the Juniors that year.

Henri Kontinen and Christopher Rungkat won in the final 6–0, 6–3, against Jaan-Frederik Brunken and Matt Reid.

Seeds

Draw

Final four teams

Top half

Bottom half

External links
 Draw

Boys' Doubles
2008